Muhammad ibn Khalid can refer to:

 Muhammad ibn Khalid al-Qasri, Abbasid governor in the mid-8th century
 Muhammad ibn Khalid ibn Barmak, one of the Barmakids, Abbasid courtier under Harun al-Rashid
 Muhammad ibn Khalid al-Shaybani, Abbasid general and governor in Transcaucasia in the mid-9th century